The Chuya, also known as Big Chuya in its last  stretch, is a river in Buryatia and Irkutsk Oblast, Russia.

The Mamsko-Chuysky District of Irkutsk Oblast is named after rivers Mama and Chuya. The district's settlement of Chuya is located on the right bank of the Lena River at the confluence with the Chuya.

History
In the 20th century there were mica mining operations in the upper basin of the Chuya. Gorno-Chuysky was a settlement of workers on the right bank of the river. It had had over 4,000 inhabitants in 1970, but lost population following the collapse of the USSR and only a residual population remained. Finally it was abolished in 2019.

Currently tourists visit the Chuya mainly for angling and watersports. The main fish species in the river are dace, lenok, whitefish, grayling and taimen.

Course  
The Chuya is a right tributary of the Lena, its 13th longest tributary. It has its sources in a small mountain lake of the Synnyr Massif of the North Baikal Highlands and flows in a roughly NNE direction across the highland area within the North Baikal District of Buryatia. Its channel is very stony and often divides into branches, with willows growing in the banks and in the islands. As it flows roughly northwards past the confluence of its Tukulakh tributary there is a long, tumultuous stretch with rapids and cascades. Downstream from the Gorno-Chuysky ghost town zone the river proceeds along a narrow valley with riffles in the current. Further north there is another area of strong rapids.

After it leaves the mountain area the Chuya river slows down, the river channel widens and it is joined by the Malaya Chuya on its left bank. In its last  stretch the Chuya flows northwards across a floodplain as the Bolshaya Chuya.
Finally the Chuya meets the right bank of the Lena by Chuya village, at the border of the Sakha Republic (Yakutia),  from its mouth. The town of Vitim lies just a few miles downstream from the confluence.

The river freezes between October and May. Permafrost is distributed in the river basin in an uneven, discontinuous pattern.

See also
List of rivers of Russia

References

External links 
Иркутские взрывотехники устранили ледовый затор на реке Большая Чуя (removing ice with explosives)
Идем на пороги. Горные реки Восточной Сибири (Mountain rivers of Eastern Siberia)
Pictures - Baikal Nature

Rivers of Buryatia
Rivers of Irkutsk Oblast